is a Japanese manga series written and illustrated by Yōko Nemu. The manga was published in Shodensha's Feel Young magazine between 2008 and 2009, with three tankōbon volumes. The first sequel to the manga, was compiled into four volumes between 2010 and 2011, while the second one, was released into a single volume in 2012.

It was adapted into a live-action series that debuted on March 20, 2013. It had 12 episodes, each with 12 minutes.

Cast
 Tsubasa Honda as Momoko
 Joe Odagiri as Tagaya
 Sho Aoyagi as Wajima
 Haruka Kinami as Endō
 Soukou Wada as Dōmoto
 Tasuku Nagaoka as Taki
 Shohei Uno as Tanabe
 Aoba Kawai as Mano
 Masahiro Usui as Tamotsu
 Izumi Fujimoto as Kēko
 Aoi Nakabeppu as Yuka
 Jun Yoshinaga as Haruka

References

External links
 
 午前３時の無法地帯(2013) at allcinema (in Japanese)
 午前３時の無法地帯 at KINENOTE (in Japanese)

2012 manga
Josei manga
Shodensha franchises
Shodensha manga